San Giuseppe Sposo di Maria is baroque-style, Roman Catholic parish church located in  the town of Fanano in the province of Modena, region of Emilia-Romagna,  Italy.

History
The church was built in 1619, along with the Collegio delle Scuole Pie, by Ottonello Ottonelli. The interiors are richly decorated with polychrome marble. Among the canvases in the interior are a Martyrdom of St Catherine of Alexandria by Guercino, and a Madonna della Ghiara attributed to Ludovico Lana. Other paintings are attributed to Pellegrino da Fanano and Girolamo Vanulli. The nave ceiling was painted by Fermo Forti. From the church there was a corridor accessing the city hall.

References

17th-century Roman Catholic church buildings in Italy
Roman Catholic churches completed in 1619
Churches in Fanano
Baroque architecture in Emilia-Romagna
1619 establishments in Italy